David Aaron Clark (September 5, 1960 – November 28, 2009) was an author, musician, pornographic actor, and pornographic video director.

Career
Switching majors and finally graduating with a degree in journalism in 1986. He served as editor-in-chief of The Daily Targum, Rutgers' student newspaper, winning multiple Columbia Scholastic Press Association College Gold Circle Awards.

Clark then worked as a stringer at The Bergen Record and the New Brunswick Home News Tribune before becoming an online editor at Dow Jones News Service. He left after two years to accept an editorial position at Genesis magazine, followed by a five-year tenure at Al Goldstein's Screw magazine.

Clark also edited the fanzine Chrome on Fire, and performed in the band False Virgins, produced by Sonic Youth guitarist Lee Ranaldo. The band released two albums at the turn of the decade -The 1990 album Skin Job, engineered by Brooklyn producer Martin Bisi. When the lead singer committed suicide, Clark broke up the band and retired from playing music.

Clark wrote several works of erotic fiction, including The Wet Forever about the relationship between
a hedonistic man (Janus) and a dominatrix (Madchen). 

He moved to San Francisco in 1995 and was hired for an editorial position at the now-defunct The Spectator.

In 1998 he moved to Los Angeles to accept a position directing porn videos for John T. Bone’s Cream Studios. His screenplay for Brad Armstrong’s Euphoria won an AVN Award for Best Screenplay in 2000.
He has directed features for companies ranging from Extreme Associates to Vivid Video.

In an interview with Luke Ford Clark said:

His most recent film, PURE, for Evil Angel, received multiple AVN nominations, including Best Actor (Keni Styles), Best Actress (Asa Akira), Best Supporting Actor (Jake Malone), Best Couples Sex Scene, Best Music Soundtrack, Best Special Effects, Best Screenplay, Best Director – Feature and Best Video Feature.

He died suddenly on November 28, 2009, reportedly as the result of a pulmonary embolism.

Bibliography

Novels
 The Wet Forever (1991, Rhinoceros Publications reissue 1995) 
 Sister Radiance (1992, Rhinoceros reissue 1994) 
 The Marquis de Sade's Juliette: Vengeance On The Lord (1993, Masquerade books 1996) 
 Into The Black (Titan Books, London) (1995)

Collaborations
 Ritual Sex (Co-edit with Tristan Taormino) (Masquerade Books, 1995) 
 True Blood (Text with Charles Gatewood photography, 1997, Last Gasp Books) 
 The Fallen: The Pale Door (Graphic novel, illustrated by Miran Kim) (NBM/Nantier Beall Minoustchine Publishing, 1999) 
 The Fallen: Cold Religion (Graphic novel, illustrated by David Rankin, 2000, 2004)

Anthology appearances
 Gahan Wilson’s the Ultimate Haunted House (Byron Preiss Press) 
 World’s Best Erotica (Titan Books)
 Best Of Gauntlet Magazine (Richard Kasak Books)

Music releases
 False Virgins, SKINJOB (1990, Enemy Records)
 False Virgins, INFERNAL DOLL (1991, Enemy Records)

Footnotes

References
 
 Columbia Scholastic Press Association : 1986 Collegiate Circle Recipients
 Real Life Fun and Games with David Aaron Clark Spectator, 1993 article by Clark about S&M date with Mistress Shane
 Madness Signs David Aaron Clark October 4, 2004 article by RogReviews.com
 David Aaron Clark April 2005 "Sex Wrecks" Profile by Peter Landau
 Gram Ponante: Porn Valley Observed: David Aaron Clark: "I am not Phil Collins." Interview on July 26, 2005

American male pornographic film actors
BDSM writers
1960 births
2009 deaths
American pornographic film directors
Writers from Camden, New Jersey
Rutgers University alumni
Actors from Camden, New Jersey
Film directors from New Jersey
20th-century American male actors
Deaths from pulmonary embolism